NGC 7053 is a spiral galaxy located about 200 million light-years away in the constellation of Pegasus. It was discovered by astronomer Albert Marth on September 2, 1863. It was then rediscovered by astronomer Heinrich d'Arrest on October 8, 1865.

On June 4, 2003 a type la supernova designated as SN 2003ep was discovered in NGC 7053.

See also 
 NGC 7042

References

External links 

Spiral galaxies
Pegasus (constellation)
7053
11727
66610
Astronomical objects discovered in 1863